Jeff Vetere (born 1966) is an English football youth coach, scout and technical co-ordinator. He has also worked for the Premier League. Vetere is credited with an encyclopaedic knowledge of footballers and is fluent in several languages including Spanish, French and Italian.

Life and career 
Vetere's playing career began as an apprentice at Luton Town where he later coached in the youth set-up before moving to Rushden & Diamonds where he was brought in by manager Brian Talbot in 1997 and put in charge of the newly established youth academy.

Vetere moved on to Charlton Athletic where his official role became overseas coordinator but day-to-day involvement included working with the first team. The full-back Grant Basey, who broke into the first team in 2007 at the age of 19, has credited Vetere with his development.

Alan Curbishley had worked with Vetere at Charlton and brought him to West Ham United in January 2007.

Vetere was snapped up by Real Madrid at the end of the 2007 season to work under the technical director, Miguel Ángel Portugal, and the club's director of international football, the former FC Barcelona and Rayo Vallecano goalkeeper Julen Lopetegui. His role was to help the Spanish club scout and sign the best talents across the world.
Vetere's final piece of business at Real Madrid was securing a deal for Ghana U17 fullback Daniel Opare ahead of Liverpool in January 2008.

Vetere was recruited from Real Madrid and appointed as Newcastle United's technical co-ordinator in January 2008 to complete a continental-style management structure working to assist Kevin Keegan.

Vetere was appointed as chief scout of Aston Villa by manager Gérard Houllier in November 2010.

He later worked as international scout for Fulham.

He joined EFL Championship club Birmingham City as director of football in May 2017, and left the club in March 2018 when manager Steve Cotterill was dismissed with the team in the relegation zone.

In September 2022, Vetere, a close friend of Tottenham Hotspur's managing director of football Fabio Paratici, joined him at Tottenham, taking on the role of a scout. Vetere left the club in February 2023 after he appeared to reveal on Colombian TV that Tottenham were interested in Colombian goalkeeper Kevin Mier.

References 

1966 births
Living people
Luton Town F.C. non-playing staff
Charlton Athletic F.C. non-playing staff
West Ham United F.C. non-playing staff
Real Madrid CF non-playing staff
Newcastle United F.C. non-playing staff
Aston Villa F.C. non-playing staff
Birmingham City F.C. non-playing staff
Fulham F.C. non-playing staff
Tottenham Hotspur F.C. non-playing staff
Association football coaches
Association football scouts